Rennae Stubbs  (born 26 March 1971) is an Australian tennis coach, television commentator, and former professional player. She is the host of The Power Hour on Amazon Prime Video Sports Talk. She worked at the Seven Network between 2011 and 2018 as an analyst and is now a full time commentator for ESPN tennis and the host of her own podcast, The Rennae Stubbs Tennis Podcast. She was an Australian Institute of Sport scholarship holder.

Stubbs won four Grand Slam doubles titles and two mixed-doubles titles. She was ranked world No. 1 in doubles in 2000. She represented Australia at four successive Summer Olympic Games: Atlanta 1996, Sydney 2000, Athens 2004, and Beijing 2008.

Stubbs has recorded more doubles triumphs than any other Australian woman—60 from 1992 to the conclusion of the 2010 WTA Tour—enjoying success with eleven different partners. In 2001, Stubbs won the season-ending WTA Championships with regular partner Lisa Raymond and the pair were named ITF World Champions.

Stubbs is the longest-serving member of the Australia Fed Cup team, having played for 17 years since 1992, with a 28–9 win–loss record in doubles; the second highest in Australian Fed Cup Team history behind Wendy Turnbull (29–8). She retired from Fed Cup play after the 2011 Fed Cup tie with Italy. Stubbs played on the WTA Tour for the rest of 2011 mostly with Casey Dellacqua and played her last tour match at the 2011 US Open with Dellacqua. She then finished her career winning the World TeamTennis title for the third time with the Washington Kastles, her fifth overall WTT title.

Stubbs transitioned from her playing days immediately into a successful television career as a commentator and host for TV Networks including, ESPN, Tennis Channel and Channel Seven Australia. She also worked as the lead female analyst at the 2012 London the 2016 Rio and the 2020 Tokyo Olympics for NBC.

In the subsequent years, Stubbs had also began advising and coaching tennis players. From August 2018 until spring 2019, she was coach of the professional Karolína Plíšková. Around this time, Stubbs was one of only two female top ten player coaches alongside Conchita Martínez.

In January 2019, Stubbs received the OLY post-nominal title at the Brisbane International tournament.

Stubbs subsequently had been added to the coaching team of Samantha Stosur. Originally, she was only expected to finish out the 2019 season with Stosur, however, given the success of Stosur at the end of 2019, the pair have decided to continue on in 2020, starting in Australia. With Stubbs as her coach, Stosur won a Grand Slam, the 2021 U.S. Open doubles, with playing partner Zhang Shuai. Stubbs also coached Genie Bouchard throughout 2020 where Bouchard improved her ranking from 330 to 120 on the WTA rankings.

For the 2022 US Open, Stubbs was part of tennis great Serena Williams’ team as she contested her final grand slam tournament.

In 2022, Embassy Row announced that Stubbs will host The Power Hour on Amazon Prime Video. On November 14, 2022, Stubbs made her debut on The Power Hour.

Grand Slam tournament finals

Women's doubles: 7 (4–3)

Mixed doubles: 3 (2–1)

WTA career finals

Doubles: 103 (60–43)

ITF Circuit finals

Singles: 3 (2–1)

Doubles: 16 (10–6)

Grand Slam performance timelines

Doubles

Mixed doubles

Personal life
In a 2006 newspaper interview, Stubbs identified herself as a lesbian.

References

External links

 
 
 
 

1971 births
Living people
Australian female tennis players
Australian Open (tennis) champions
Olympic tennis players of Australia
Australian LGBT sportspeople
Sportswomen from New South Wales
Tennis players at the 1996 Summer Olympics
Tennis players at the 2004 Summer Olympics
Tennis players at the 2008 Summer Olympics
US Open (tennis) champions
Wimbledon champions
Australian Institute of Sport tennis players
Lesbian sportswomen
LGBT tennis players
Grand Slam (tennis) champions in women's doubles
Grand Slam (tennis) champions in mixed doubles
Tennis players from Sydney
Tennis players at the 2000 Summer Olympics
WTA number 1 ranked doubles tennis players
ITF World Champions